The  began the war as a Confederate privateer.  The Union Navy acquired the schooner from the prize court and outfitted the vessel for blockade duty.

Privateer
As one method to counter Union naval power, the Confederacy issued letters of marque to facilitate the use of privateers against northern shipping. A group headed by A. F. W. Abrams of Charleston, S.C. acquired the schooner Priscilla C. Ferguson to arm her as a privateer.  They renamed her vessel Beauregard and fitted out with a single 24–pounder rifled gun and accommodations for a 40-man crew.  The privateer Beauregard was commissioned in Charleston, S.C. on October 14, 1861.  The ship's preparations did not go unreported. By October 24, 1861, a northern ship master had notified Secretary of the Navy Welles that both Beauregard and Dixie were at Charleston preparing for service as privateers.

Captain Gilbert Hay, with two lieutenants, one purser, and 23 crewmen, succeeded in running the blockade unobserved on November 5, 1861. During the Beauregard’s time as an active privateer, no captures were reported. On November 12, 1861 Lt. William C. Rogers commanding the  spotted Beauregard in the Bahama Channel.  Even though Beauregard sailed with fewer men than originally planned, the "many men on her decks" attracted Lt. Rogers’ attention to the schooner when only 4 miles off."  After a 2-hour chase, Anderson was able to capture the vessel. When Captain Hay finally surrendered, he presented his letter of marque from Jefferson Davis to his captors.  After taking control of Beauregard and putting a prize crew on board, Lt. Rogers proceeded to take the prisoners and the prize to Key West for adjudication. Anderson and its prize arrived in Florida on November 19, 1861.  The prize court condemned the schooner with gross proceeds of $2,146.67 and $1,854.92 for distribution after costs and expenses.

U. S. Navy
The U.S. Navy purchased the Beauregard from the prize court for $1,810 on February 24, 1862 and began fitting the schooner for service with the blockading squadrons.  To replace the 24 pound rifled gun that the privateer's crew had spiked, the navy armed the Beauregard with a single 30 pound rifle and two 12 pound howitzers.  The ship was allocated to the East Gulf Blockading Squadron, then commanded by Flag Officer William McKean. Flag Officer McKean assigned Acting Master David Stearns to command the Beauregard and the ship was commissioned on March 28, 1862.

During the Beauregard’s service with the Eastern Gulf squadron, she patrolled the coasts of Florida and was credited with capturing 11 blockade runners.  Like other ships assigned to blockade duty, the Beauregard was also called upon to participate in attacks against coastal locations.  On April 2, 1863, she supported an attack against Tampa, Florida and on July 28, 1863, she was in action at New Smyrna, Florida.

Prizes and adjudication

Post-war record 
The schooner was sold at Key West, Florida, June 28, 1865.

References 

 Official records of the Union and Confederate Navies in the War of the Rebellion. Series I: 27 volumes. Series II: 3 volumes. Washington: Government Printing Office, 1894–1922.
 Porter, David D. The Naval History of the Civil War Castle, Secaucus, NJ, 1984, .
 Silverstone, Paul H. Warships of the Civil War Navies Naval Institute Press, Annapolis, MD, 1989, .

Ships of the Union Navy
Gunboats of the United States Navy
Schooners of the United States Navy